James, Jim, or Jimmy Brooks may refer to:

 James Brooks (American football) (born 1958), American football player
 James Brooks (architect) (1825–1901), English architect
 James Brooks (bishop) (1512–1558), Bishop of Gloucester
 James Brooks (musician) (1760–1809), English violinist and composer
 James Brooks (civil servant) (1863–1941), British Admiralty Director of Victualling
 James Brooks (painter) (1906–1992), American painter
 James Brooks (politician) (1810–1873), United States Representative from New York
 James Brooks (rugby union) (born 1980), English rugby player
 James Brooks (Texas Ranger) (1855–1944), American lawman
 James Brooks (priest), Anglican clergyman
 James Brooks, Jr. (1942–1999), American actor, known by his stage name of Stephen Brooks
 James F. Brooks (born 1955), American historian
 James L. Brooks (born 1940), American producer, writer and film director
 Jim Brooks, co-owner of the Lehigh Valley Phantoms ice hockey team
 Jimmy Brooks, fictional character on Degrassi: The Next Generation
 James Brooks, guitarist with British post-rock band Appliance

See also
James Brooks House (disambiguation)
James Brook (1897–1989), English cricketer
James Brooke (disambiguation)
James Hall Brookes (1830–1897), American religious writer
Jamie Brooks (born 1983), English football player